Klara Emilia "Emy" Gauffin (12 December 1928 – 2 February 1993) was a Swedish orienteering competitor. She received a bronze medal in the individual event at the 1962 European Orienteering Championships in Løten. She was also member of the Swedish team that won the relay competition, although not officially part of the championship.

References

1928 births
1993 deaths
Swedish orienteers
Female orienteers
Foot orienteers
20th-century Swedish people